Nicholas Petit-Frere (born September 15, 1999) is an American football offensive tackle for the Tennessee Titans of the National Football League (NFL). He played college football at Ohio State.

Early life and high school career
Petit-Frere grew up in Tampa, Florida and attended Berkeley Preparatory School, where he played football and basketball. He is of Haitian descent through his father. Petit-Frere was considered a five-star recruit and committed to play college football at Ohio State after considering offers from Alabama and Florida.

College career
Petit-Frere redshirted his true freshman season. As a redshirt freshman, he played in all 14 of Ohio State's games with one start. As a redshirt sophomore, Petit-Frere was named second-team All-Big Ten after starting all seven of Ohio State's games in the team's COVID-19-shortened 2020 season. On December 27, 2021, Petit-Frere announced that he would be opting out of the 2022 Rose Bowl and declaring for the 2022 NFL Draft.

Professional career

Nicholas Petit-Frere was invited to the NFL Scouting Combine along with other top offensive linemen after an impressive career at Ohio State.  He measured in at 6'5" and 316 lbs., while bench-pressing 24 reps at the Combine.  At the conclusion of the pre-draft process, draft analysts projected Petit-Frere as a second-round or third-round pick.  He was ranked as the sixth-best offensive tackle prospect, behind Evan Neal, Ikem Ekwonu, Charles Cross, Bernhard Raimann, and Trevor Penning.  

Petit-Frere was taken in the third round, 69th overall, of the 2022 NFL Draft by the Tennessee Titans.

Heading into his first training camp in the NFL, Nicholas Petit-Frere was the starting right tackle opposite of starting left tackle Taylor Lewan.  

Petit-Frere made his first career start and NFL debut in the Titans' Week 1 loss to the New York Giants.  He continued to hold down the starting right tackle job for the rest of the season, missing one game in Week 17 due to an ankle injury.  

Overall, Petit-Frere played in 16 games (16 starts) in his rookie season and appeared in 97% of the offensive snaps that year, allowing 5 sacks and committing 8 penalties.  Pro Football Focus gave him a 52.3 grade for the season.

References

External links 
 
 Tennessee Titans bio
 Ohio State Buckeyes bio

1999 births
Living people
American football offensive tackles
American sportspeople of Haitian descent
Ohio State Buckeyes football players
Players of American football from Tampa, Florida
All-American college football players
Tennessee Titans players